The Calcari Grigi di Noriglio Formation is a geological formation in Italy, dating to roughly between 200 and 190 million years ago and covering the Hettangian to Sinemurian stages of the Jurassic Period in the Mesozoic Era.Fossil prosauropod tracks have been reported from the formation.

See also

 List of dinosaur-bearing rock formations
 List of stratigraphic units with sauropodomorph tracks
 Prosauropod tracks

Footnotes

References
 Weishampel, David B.; Dodson, Peter; and Osmólska, Halszka (eds.): The Dinosauria, 2nd, Berkeley: University of California Press. 861 pp. .

Jurassic System of Europe
Geologic formations of Italy